Reginald William Lyons (12 July 1922 in Dublin, Ireland – 12 September 1976 in Worthing, Sussex, England) was an Irish cricketer. A right-handed batsman and wicket-keeper, he played just once for the Ireland cricket team, a first-class match against Scotland in May 1947.

References

1922 births
1976 deaths
Cricketers from Dublin (city)
Irish cricketers
Wicket-keepers